Iruka-ike Dam(入鹿池) is an earthfill dam located in Aichi Prefecture in Japan. The dam is used for flood control and irrigation. The catchment area of the dam is 34.4 km2. The dam impounds about 152  ha of land when full and can store 18479 thousand cubic meters of water. The construction of the dam was started on 1978 and completed in 1991.

References

Dams in Aichi Prefecture
1991 establishments in Japan